Tibor Füzessy (born 14 September 1928) is a Hungarian politician and jurist, who served as Minister of Civilian Intelligence Services of Hungary between 1992 and 1994.

References
 Biográf ki kicsoda (Budapest, 2003)
 Bölöny, József – Hubai, László: Magyarország kormányai 1848–2004 [Cabinets of Hungary 1848–2004], Akadémiai Kiadó, Budapest, 2004 (5th edition).

1928 births
Living people
Christian Democratic People's Party (Hungary) politicians
Secret ministers of Hungary
Members of the National Assembly of Hungary (1990–1994)
Members of the National Assembly of Hungary (1994–1998)